Binion is a surname. Notable people with the surname include:

Benny Binion (1904–1989), American businessman and convicted murderer
Jack Binion (born 1937), American businessman
Ted Binion (1943–1998), American businessman
Joe Binion (born 1961), American basketball player
McArthur Binion (born 1946), American artist